The 2016 Tel Aviv shooting may refer to one of two mass shootings that occurred in Tel Aviv in 2016.

January 2016 Tel Aviv shooting
June 2016 Tel Aviv shooting